Calophyllum elegans is a species of tropical flowering plants in the family Calophyllaceae. It grows as a 9.1 m (30 feet) tall tree. It is an endangered species native to Borneo, where it is confined to Sarawak.

It grows on sandy clay soil at the edge of swamp forest, kerangas forest, and mixed dipterocarp forests below 580 meters elevation.

References

External links 

 Calophyllum elegans at Tropicos
 Specimen MNHN-P-P04633825 at Museum National d'Histoire Naturelle, Paris is from Semenggoh arboretum, Kuching, Sarawak, Malaysia

elegans
Endemic flora of Borneo
Flora of Sarawak
Flora of the Borneo lowland rain forests